Lee Anthony Angol (born 4 August 1994) is an English professional footballer who plays for Sutton United.

Career

Wycombe Wanderers
On 2 July 2012, Angol was signed by Wycombe Wanderers after leaving Tottenham Hotspur, having been a regular in their academy team. He made his professional debut on 11 August as a 100th-minute substitute for Matt Bloomfield against Watford in the League Cup first round, which finished as a 1–0 defeat after extra time. Angol then made his league debut as an 84th-minute substitute for Grant Basey in a 1–0 defeat at home to Gillingham on 21 August. On 28 January 2013, Angol joined Isthmian League Premier Division club Hendon on a five-week loan. He scored on his debut two days later in a 3–1 victory over Croydon in the London Senior Cup, and this was followed up with a goal in the following match, a 2–1 victory over Carshalton Athletic. Angol's loan was extended on 7 March until 2 April. He completed the loan spell with three goals from 10 appearances. Upon his return to Wycombe, Angol signed a new one-year contract with the club in May 2013.

Angol started 2013–14 on loan at Hendon, having rejoined the club on a one-month loan on 17 August 2013. He scored on his second debut later that day in a 5–3 defeat at home to Maidstone United, and completed the loan spell with two goals from four appearances. Angol joined Conference South club Maidenhead United on a one-month youth loan on 5 October. He made his debut and only appearance for the club later that day in a 3–1 defeat at home to Havant & Waterlooville. On 24 January 2014, Angol signed for Maidenhead's Conference South rivals Boreham Wood on an initial one-month loan. He debuted a day later as a 77th-minute substitute in a 2–2 draw at home to Dover Athletic. Angol's loan was extended until the end of the season, which he completed with 22 appearances and seven goals.

Luton Town
On 9 July 2014, Angol signed a one-year contract with newly promoted League Two club Luton Town on a free transfer, and was immediately sent out on a season-long loan to Boreham Wood. He finished 2014–15 as the Conference South top scorer with 25 goals from 39 appearances, as well as additional goals in Boreham Wood's FA Cup campaign and play-off victory, helping them to promotion to the National League for the first time in their history. He was named as the club's Player of the Season alongside winning the Young Player of the Year accolade at the National Game Awards. Luton offered him a new contract in May 2015 upon his return from the loan, but Angol rejected it.

Peterborough United
Angol signed a three-year contract with League One club Peterborough United on 20 July 2015. He scored twice on his debut for the club in a 5–1 victory away to Oldham Athletic on 12 September, and finished 2015–16 with 38 appearances and 11 goals.

Angol fractured his ankle in a pre-season friendly against Boston United in July 2016 and required surgery to place a pin in his leg. On 6 March 2017, Angol was loaned to National League club Lincoln City until the end of 2016–17. He scored a hat-trick on his debut a day later in a 4–0 victory away to Braintree Town, and completed the loan spell with 13 appearances and six goals. Upon his return to Peterborough, Angol was transfer-listed by the club.

Mansfield Town
On 18 May 2017, Angol joined League Two club Mansfield Town for an undisclosed fee.

Shrewsbury Town
Angol signed for League One club Shrewsbury Town on 9 August 2018 on a two-year contract for an undisclosed fee, with the option of a further year. He rejoined League Two leaders Lincoln on 31 January 2019 on loan until the end of 2018–19, and made only two brief substitute appearances.

Leyton Orient
On 1 July 2019, Angol joined newly promoted League Two club Leyton Orient for an undisclosed fee, signing a two-year contract. At the end of the 2020–21 season, Angol was released by the club.

Bradford City
On 22 June 2021, following his departure from Leyton Orient, Angol agreed to join Bradford City on an initial one-year deal.

On 4 May 2022, Angol signed a new one-year contract extension with the option for a further twelve months.

Sutton United
He signed for Sutton United for an undisclosed fee on 11 January 2023.

Career statistics

Honours
Boreham Wood
Conference South play-offs: 2014–15

Lincoln City
National League: 2016–17

Individual
Conference South Golden Boot: 2014–15
Boreham Wood Player of the Year: 2014–15
Boreham Wood Young Player of the Year: 2014–15

References

External links

1994 births
Living people
Footballers from Carshalton
English footballers
Association football midfielders
Association football forwards
Wycombe Wanderers F.C. players
Hendon F.C. players
Maidenhead United F.C. players
Boreham Wood F.C. players
Luton Town F.C. players
Peterborough United F.C. players
Lincoln City F.C. players
Mansfield Town F.C. players
Shrewsbury Town F.C. players
Leyton Orient F.C. players
Bradford City A.F.C. players
English Football League players
Isthmian League players
National League (English football) players
Sutton United F.C. players